The 1990 FIVB Men's World Championship was the twelfth edition of the tournament, organised by the world's governing body, the FIVB. It was held from 18 to 28 October 1990 in Brazil.

Qualification

Venues

Squads

Results

First round

Pool A
Location: Rio de Janeiro

|}

|}

Pool B
Location: Brasília

|}

|}

Pool C
Location: Curitiba

|}

|}

Pool D
Location: Brasília

|}

|}

Final round

Play-offs for quarterfinals
Location: Brasília

|}

Group head matches
Location: Rio de Janeiro

|}

13th–16th places
Location: Curitiba

|}

|}

9th–12th places

9th–12th semifinals

|}

11th place match

|}

9th place match

|}

Finals

Quarterfinals

|}

5th–8th semifinals

|}

Semifinals

|}

7th place match

|}

5th place match

|}

3rd place match

|}

Final

|}

Final standing

References

External links
Federation Internationale de Volleyball

World Championship
V
International sports competitions in Rio de Janeiro (city)
FIVB Volleyball Men's World Championship
International volleyball competitions hosted by Brazil
October 1990 sports events in South America